Maka Kotto (born December 7, 1961) is a Cameroonian-born French-Canadian politician. Educated in France, Kotto immigrated to Quebec, Canada, where he was an educator before entering politics. Kotto was a Parti Québécois member of the National Assembly of Quebec for the riding of Bourget.  From 2012 to 2014, he served as the Minister of Culture and Communications.  A former member of the House of Commons of Canada for the Bloc Québécois, Kotto is also a published author and has appeared in films.

Early life and education
Kotto was born in Douala, Cameroon, and graduated from high school at Lycée Henri-Martin in Saint-Quentin, France. He studied law, politics, dramatic art and cinema in Nanterre, Bordeaux and Paris. Kotto immigrated to Quebec in 2006.

Before becoming a politician Kotto was an author, actor, and stage director. He appeared in the 1989 movie How to Make Love to a Negro Without Getting Tired (Comment faire l'amour avec un nègre sans se fatiguer), based on the novel by Dany Laferrière. He also appeared in a second film in 2000, Lumumba, starring as Joseph Kasa-Vubu.

Kotto was also an educator in dramatic art for nearly 15 years in France and Quebec.

Federal political career
Kotto was elected to the House of Commons of Canada, representing the Bloc Québécois in the 2004 Canadian federal election. In that election, he defeated incumbent Liberal MP Yolande Thibeault and five other candidates. Upon winning the Saint-Lambert riding, Kotto became the first black Canadian Member of Parliament for the Bloc. He was re-elected two years later, winning a comfortable, but reduced, popular vote and a much larger plurality in the 2006 Canadian federal election. He defeated five other candidates to win his second term in office.

Kotto served as the Bloc's critic for Canadian heritage.

Provincial political career
On November 12, 2007, Kotto announced that he would be the candidate for the Parti Québécois in the provincial riding of Bourget in Montreal to fill a vacancy created by the resignation of former PQ House Leader Diane Lemieux. It was his second attempt at provincial politics; he was defeated in his previous candidacy in Viau by former Liberal MNA William Cusano.

Kotto resigned his seat in House of Commons of Canada on March 5, 2008, in order to run in the provincial by-election. His vacancy was officially recognized by the Speaker on March 13, 2008.

On May 12, 2008, he won the Bourget by-election as a Parti Québécois candidate with 40% of the vote.

With the election of the Parti Québécois on September 4, 2012, Kotto became Minister of Culture and Communications.

Kotto was re-elected in the 2014 Quebec election with a smaller margin, but the Parti Québécois government of Pauline Marois was defeated and Kotto became a member of the Official Opposition caucus. He was defeated in the 2018 election.

Personal life
Kotto is the husband of former Longueuil mayor and Bloc Québécois caucus colleague Caroline St-Hilaire, and is the father of four children.

Selected filmography
 How to Make Love to a Negro Without Getting Tired (Comment faire l'amour avec un nègre sans se fatiguer) - 1989
 Between the Devil and the Deep Blue Sea - 1995 
 Beaumarchais - 1996
 Lumumba - 2000
 On Your Head (Le Ciel sur la tête) - 2001
 A Silent Love - 2004
 Looking for Alexander (Mémoires affectives) - 2004
 On the Verge of a Fever (Le Goût des jeunes filles) - 2004
 How to Conquer America in One Night (Comment conquérir l'Amérique en une nuit) - 2004
 Zim and Co. - 2005
 A Sunday in Kigali (Un dimanche à Kigali) - 2006

Electoral record

	

|-

|-

|-

|No designation
|Yannick Duguay
|align="right"|121
|align="right"|0.45
|align="right"|–
|}

Books
Kotto, Maka. Femme : libre exaltation poétique. Outremont, Québec: Lanctôt, 2002. 93 p.; 21 cm. (Series: J'aime la poésie 12e)

References

External links

House of Commons of Canada: Maka Kotto
 

1961 births
Black Canadian male actors
Black Canadian politicians
Bloc Québécois MPs
Canadian poets in French
Cameroonian emigrants to Canada
Francophone Quebec people
Living people
Male actors from Montreal
Members of the Executive Council of Quebec
Members of the House of Commons of Canada from Quebec
Naturalized citizens of Canada
Parti Québécois MNAs
Politicians from Montreal
Canadian actor-politicians
People from Douala
People from Saint-Quentin, Aisne
21st-century Canadian poets
Writers from Montreal
Black Canadian writers
Canadian male poets
21st-century Canadian politicians
Canadian male film actors
Canadian male television actors
21st-century Canadian male writers
Quebecor people